Helminthosporium papulosum is a fungal plant pathogen that causes blister canker on pear and apple.

References

External links 
 Index Fungorum
 USDA ARS Fungal Database

Fungal tree pathogens and diseases
Apple tree diseases
Pear tree diseases
Pleosporaceae